Swiss Central Basketball is a Swiss professional basketball club based in Luzern. Founded in 2009, the team currently plays in the Swiss Basketball League (SBL), the top-tier league in Switzerland.

Notable players
- Set a club record or won an individual award as a professional player.
- Played at least one official international match for his senior national team at any time.
 Toni Rocak

References

External links
Official website

Basketball teams in Switzerland
Sport in Lucerne